Young at Heart is a 1995 television film directed by Allan Arkush and starring Chelsea Altman, Yannick Bisson, and Philip Bosco.  Frank Sinatra appears as himself in his final screen performance. It is also Sinatra's final role before his death.

Cast

Production
The film was shot in Toronto, staged as Hoboken, New Jersey.

Reception
Todd Everett of Variety praised the performance by Dukakis and wrote that "impressive perfs are given by Penny, Landers, Bosco and virtually all of the supporting players."

Lynne Heffley of the Los Angeles Times called it a "contrived Olympia Dukakis vehicle" that is nevertheless "a guilty pleasure."

References

External links

1995 comedy-drama films
1995 films
1995 television films
American comedy-drama television films
1990s English-language films
Films shot in Toronto
Films directed by Allan Arkush
Films set in Hudson County, New Jersey
Films scored by Mason Daring
1990s American films